Same (John) Shaw VC (Unknown – 27 December 1859) was a Scottish recipient of the Victoria Cross, the highest and most prestigious award for gallantry in the face of the enemy that can be awarded to British and Commonwealth forces.

Details
Shaw was a private in the 3rd Battalion, The Rifle Brigade (Prince Consort's Own), British Army during the Indian Mutiny when the following deed took place on 13 June 1858 at Lucknow, India for which he was awarded the VC:

He later achieved the rank of corporal.

The medal
His Victoria Cross is displayed at the Royal Green Jackets (Rifles) Museum, Winchester, England.

References

Monuments to Courage (David Harvey, 1999)
The Register of the Victoria Cross (This England, 1997)
Scotland's Forgotten Valour (Graham Ross, 1995)

British recipients of the Victoria Cross
Rifle Brigade soldiers
1859 deaths
Indian Rebellion of 1857 recipients of the Victoria Cross
Burials at sea
People from Prestonpans
British Army personnel of the Crimean War
British Army recipients of the Victoria Cross
Year of birth unknown
People who died at sea